Henrythenavigator (foaled February 28, 2005) is an American-bred and Irish-trained Thoroughbred racehorse. He won the 2000 Guineas, the Irish 2,000 Guineas, the St. James's Palace Stakes and the Sussex Stakes in 2008.

After he finished second in the Breeders' Cup Classic it was announced that Henrythenavigator would retire to Ashford Stud, Kentucky (Coolmore's farm in Kentucky), to stand at stud beginning the 2009 season. For the 2010 season, he shuttled between Ashford Stud and Coolmore's Australian farm; he now shuttles between Coolmore's Ireland and Australia farms.

He is named after the Portuguese prince Henry the Navigator.

Stud record
Henrythenavigator attracted a number of top-class mares in his first season. They included: Vertigineux, the dam of Zenyatta;  Rags To Riches, winner of the Belmont Stakes; Peeping Fawn, winner of the Irish Oaks; and, Mien, dam of Kentucky Derby winner Big Brown. As a breeding stallion he was not a conspicuous success and was eventually exported to Russia, but he did sire several good winners including Pedro the Great, George Vancouver (Breeders' Cup Juvenile Turf winner) and Sudirman.

Pedigree

References

Henrythenavigator's pedigree and partial racing stats

External links
 Career 1-2-3 Colour Chart – Henrythenavigator

2005 racehorse births
Racehorses trained in Ireland
Racehorses bred in Kentucky
Irish Classic Race winners
Thoroughbred family 9-b
2000 Guineas winners